Oscilla aquilonia is a species of sea snail, a marine gastropod mollusk in the family Pyramidellidae, the pyrams and their allies.

Description
The length of the shell measures 1.2 mm

Distribution
This species occurs in the demersal zone of the Atlantic Ocean off Brazil, at depths between 64 m and 72 m.

References

 Pimenta, A. D., F. N. Santos and R. S. Absalao. 2008. Review of the genera Ividia, Folinella, Oscilla, Pseudoscilla, Tryptichus [sic] and Peristichia (Gastropoda: Pyramidellidae) from Brazil, with descriptions of four new species. Veliger 50: 171-184

External links
 To Encyclopedia of Life
 To World Register of Marine Species
 

Pyramidellidae
Gastropods described in 2008